Itatinga is a municipality in the state of São Paulo in Brazil. The population is 20,921 (2020 est.) in an area of 980 km2. The elevation is 845 m. Its name comes from the Tupi language and means "white stone".

References

Municipalities in São Paulo (state)